The Movement is the only album by American hip hop group Harlem World. It was released on March 9, 1999 through So So Def Recordings/Columbia Records. Recording sessions took place at The Hit Factory in New York City, at Krosswire Studio in Atlanta, and at Sweetfish in Argyle, New York. Production was handled by several record producers, including Dame Grease, Deric "D-Dot" Angelettie, Jermaine Dupri, The Neptunes, Trackmasters, and then-unknown Kanye West and Just Blaze. It features guest appearances from Ma$e, Carl Thomas, Drag-On, Jermaine Dupri, Nas, Nauty, Rashad, the Boys Choir of Harlem, the Teamsters, and Kelly Price. The album was a success, making it to 11 on the Billboard 200 and 5 on the Top R&B/Hip-Hop Albums and was certified gold on April 12, 1999. Two singles were spawned from the album, "I Really Like It" and "Cali Chronic". The album is now out of print.

In a 2011 interview with Complex, Just Blaze revealed that the album was the reason for his stage name, originally being a running joke between the Harlem World members when suggesting a producer name for him. It then developed to the point where they credited him on the album under the Just Blaze name. Blaze did not like the name at first, but after the album's success, eventually decided to keep the name.

Track listing

Charts

Certifications

References

External links

1999 debut albums
Columbia Records albums
Albums produced by Just Blaze
Albums produced by Kanye West
Albums produced by Dame Grease
Albums produced by the Neptunes
Albums produced by Trackmasters
Albums produced by Jermaine Dupri
So So Def Recordings albums